Panini is an Italian company that produces books, comics, magazines, stickers, trading cards and other items through its collectibles and publishing subsidiaries. It is headquartered in Modena, Italy, and named after the Panini brothers who founded it in 1961.  Panini distributes its own products, and products of third party providers. Panini maintains a Licensing Division to buy and resell licences and provide agency for individuals and newspapers seeking to purchase rights and comic licences. Through Panini Digital the company uses voice-activated software to capture football statistics, which is then sold to agents, teams, media outlets and video game manufactures.

New Media operates Panini's on-line applications, and generates income through content and data sales. Forming a partnership with FIFA in 1970, Panini published its first FIFA World Cup sticker album for the 1970 World Cup. Since then, collecting and trading stickers and cards has become part of the World Cup experience, especially for the younger generation. In 2017, a 1970 World Cup Panini sticker album signed by Pelé sold for a record £10,450.

Up until 2015, Panini produced stickers and trading cards for the UEFA Champions League. As of 2019, Panini had licence rights of football international competitions such as the FIFA World Cup, UEFA Nations League and Copa América, as well as domestic leagues including the Premier League (from the 2019–20 season), Spanish La Liga, Italian Serie A, and Argentine Primera División among others.

History

Benito and Giuseppe Panini were operating a newspaper distribution office in Modena, Italy in 1960, when they found a collection of figurines (stickers attached with glue) that a Milan company was unable to sell. The brothers bought the collection, and sold them in packets of two for ten lire each. They sold three million packets. Having had success with the figurines Giuseppe founded Panini in 1961 to manufacture and sell his own figurines. Benito joined Panini the same year. Panini sold 15 million packets of figurines in 1961. 29 million units were sold the following year, and brothers Franco and Umberto Panini joined the company in 1963. Umberto Panini died on 29 November 2013 at the age of 83.
Panini Group start sponsor Modena Volley 1968–1989.
The company became well known in the 1960s for its football collections, which soon became popular with children. Rare stickers (figurine) can reach very high prices on the collectors' market. Some popular games were invented which used stickers as playing cards.

In 1970 Panini began publishing L'Almanacco Illustrato del Calcio Italiano (The Illustrated Guide to Italian Football), after purchasing the rights from publishing house Carcano. Panini also published its first FIFA World Cup trading cards and sticker album for the 1970 World Cup in Mexico, in addition to using multilingual captions and selling stickers outside of Italy for the first time. Initiating a craze for collecting and trading stickers, Panini's stickers were an instant hit, with The Guardian stating in the UK “the tradition of swapping duplicate [World Cup] stickers was a playground fixture during the 1970s and 1980s.” Another first for Panini, in the early 1970s, was introducing self-adhesive stickers as opposed to using glue.

In 1986 Panini created a museum of figurines which they donated to the city of Modena in 1992. Panini begins assembling each World Cup squad for their sticker album a few months before they are officially announced by each nation, which means surprise call ups often do not feature in their album. A notable example of this was 17-year-old Brazilian striker Ronaldo who was called up for the Brazil squad for the 1994 FIFA World Cup.

In May 2006, Panini partnered with The Coca-Cola Company and Tokenzone to produce the first virtual sticker album for the 2006 FIFA World Cup. The album was viewable in at least 10 different languages, such as Portuguese, Dutch, English, French, German, Greek, Italian, Japanese, Korean and Spanish. For the 2014 World Cup, three million FIFA.com users took part in the Panini Digital Sticker Album contest. Panini developed an app for the 2018 World Cup where fans could collect and swap virtual stickers. Five million people gathered digital stickers for the 2018 World Cup.

The classic football stickers today are complemented by the collectible card game Adrenalyn XL, introduced in 2009. In 2010 Panini released a UEFA Champions League edition of Adrenalyn XL, containing 350 cards from 22 of the competing clubs, including defending champions FC Barcelona. Beginning in 2015, Topps signed a deal to produce stickers, trading cards and digital collections for the competition. The fourth edition of Panini FIFA 365 Adrenalyn XL was released for 2019, featuring top clubs, teams and players.

In January 2009, Panini acquired an exclusive licence to produce NBA trading cards and stickers effective with the 2009-10 NBA season. On 13 March 2009, Panini acquired the US trading card manufacturer Donruss Playoff LP. With it, Panini inherited Donruss' NFL and NFLPA licences.

In March 2010, Panini acquired a licence from the NHL and NHLPA. The 2010-11 ice hockey season was the first in five years that more than one company, with Upper Deck producing their own NHL cards. In July 2010, Panini acquired a licence to create an official sticker collection for the Olympic and Paralympic Games in London 2012.

In 2014, Panini made cards for that year's FIFA World Cup, and did the same for the 2018 edition, albeit with price hikes for packets across the world. Dubbed the “Panini Cheapskates”, in 2018 a UK couple won fans all over the world by filling in their 2018 World Cup sticker album by drawing in each player. Panini (along with Bandai) were distributors of the 2012 English dub of the 2011 Spanish television series Jelly Jamm.

During the 2018 World Cup, Panini produced an average of 8-10 million card packages per day. In 2018, Panini signed a deal with the English Premier League to produce cards under licence from the 2019–20 season.

Some of Panini's releases in 2019 included collections of movies Avengers: Endgame and Toy Story 4, and the 2019 FIFA Women's World Cup.

Panini America

In January 2009, the National Basketball Association (NBA) announced Panini would become the exclusive trading card partner of the league beginning with the 2009–10 season. In March of the same year, The Panini Group purchased assets of the industry's second-oldest trading-card company, Donruss, and formed the new subsidiary, "Panini America". The company continued to operate out of Irving, Texas, with much of the existing upper management.

Panini signed an exclusive agreement with five-time NBA champion Kobe Bryant of the Los Angeles Lakers as its official company spokesman and global trading card ambassador in 2009. Bryant's special affiliation to Panini goes back to his time growing up in Italy where he collected Italian football stickers. In March 2010, the National Hockey League Players' Association (NHLPA) and National Hockey League (NHL) granted the Panini Group a multi-year trading card licence, marking the third major sports licence that The Panini Group had secured since establishing a presence in the U.S. in 2009.

According to the Panini Group, the 2010 FIFA World Cup sticker album sold 10 million packs in the U.S. alone. In 2016, Panini America paid Cristiano Ronaldo $170,000 for signing 1,000 Panini stickers, while Neymar received $50,000 for signing 600.

This subsidiary holds official licences for NBA, NFL, NASCAR, WWE, FIFA, The Collegiate Licensing Company, Disney, DreamWorks and Warner Bros. Panini also has exclusive partnerships with Pop Warner Little Scholars, Inc., the Naismith Memorial Basketball Hall of Fame, and Pro Football Hall of Fame.

In January 2021, Panini America signed an exclusive multi-year trading card deal with the Ultimate Fighting Championship (UFC). Later in August 2021, Panini America also partnered with the UFC to release NFTs, commemorating big fights, milestones and moments.

Panini family philanthropy
Giuseppe Panini, the eldest brother and the founder of this business, and a collector himself, financed the creation of the Raccolte Fotografiche Modenesi (Modena's photographic collections), an archive of more than 300,000 photographs and a similar number of postcards, describing the life of the city and the evolution of photographic art.

See also

 Almanacco Illustrato del Calcio
 Association football trading card

References

External links 

 
 List of Panini collections on Last Sticker website

Association football culture
Book publishing companies of Italy
Italian brands
Trading cards
Trading card companies
Italian companies established in 1961